Raymond Joseph Hartranft (September 19, 1890 – February 10, 1955) was a Major League Baseball pitcher.

External links
Baseball-Reference.com

Philadelphia Phillies players
1890 births
1955 deaths
Baseball players from Pennsylvania
Allentown (minor league baseball) players
Frederick Hustlers players